Yehi'am Fortress National Park is an Israeli national park in the western Upper Galilee on the grounds of Kibbutz Yehi'am, whose main attraction are the ruins of a hilltop castle.

History
The structure is based on the Crusader-time Iudyn Castle built by the Teutonic Order after 1220, destroyed by the Mamluk sultan Baibars sometime between 1268 and 1271, rebuilt and expanded by Zahir al-Umar as Qal'at Jiddin (Jiddin Castle) in the 1760s and destroyed again by Ahmed Jezzar Pasha around 1775. The ruined fortress, known as Khirbat Jiddin (lit. "ruins of Jiddin"), was later inhabited by Bedouin tribes. The establishment of a kibbutz in 1946 is described on the Kibbutz Yehi'am page.

The buildings include a watch tower with a lookout platform, mosque, and large vaulted hall.

The 1948 trenches laid around the castle can also be visited.

Archaeological finds in the park but outside the castle precinct include the remains of a Roman fort, a Byzantine monastery, burial caves, stones inscribed with crosses and fragments of mosaic.

See also
Tourism in Israel
Khirbat Jiddin

References

External links
 Yehi'am Fortress National Park

National parks of Israel
Protected areas of Northern District (Israel)
Buildings and structures in Northern District (Israel)
13th-century establishments in the Kingdom of Jerusalem
Disestablishments in the Kingdom of Jerusalem